Laemosaccus is a genus of true weevils in the beetle family Curculionidae. There are at least 130 described species in Laemosaccus.

See also
 List of Laemosaccus species

References

Further reading

 
 
 

Curculionidae
Articles created by Qbugbot